Melt Sieberhagen is a South African actor and comic and was born in Ventersdorp.

Training
He obtained a B.A. in Drama from the University of Pretoria in 2001.

Television appearances
He starred in numerous South African soaps as well as the Afrikaans comic sketch program Kompleks II. 
He is also part of the permanent cast of Proesstraat. He has also appeared in television commercials for Cell C, TOPS @ Spar, Bioplus, McCarthy Call-a-car and Wimpy. As a voice over artist he has contributed to various television programs, commercial and a host of regular radio advertisements.

Film appearances
 Superhelde 
 District 9 
 Footskating 101
 Poena is koning
 Oh Schuks... I’m Gatvol! (2004)

References

Living people
University of Pretoria alumni
South African male actors
Afrikaner people
South African people of German descent
Year of birth missing (living people)